Hyblaea sanguinea is a moth in the family Hyblaeidae described by Max Gaede in 1917.

Subspecies
Hyblaea sanguinea sanguinea
Hyblaea sanguinea vitiensis Prout, 1919

References

Hyblaeidae